Yeosu Expo station (Ko: 여수엑스포역) is a KTX station in the city of Yeosu, South Jeolla Province, South Korea. It is on the Jeolla Line.

KTX, ITX-Saemaeul, Mugunghwa-ho, and the S-Train stop at the station. It is registered as Yeosu-EXPO (Korean name 여수EXPO) on the Korea Railroad's computer network, and is registered as just an expo on the railway logistics information system. Dolsando Island and several beaches are nearby, so many tourists enjoy it during the summer season, and it plays an important role in railroad transportation linking Suncheon and Yeosu National Industrial Complex.

See also
Expo 2012

References

External links

 Cyber station information from Korail

Railway stations in South Jeolla Province
Yeosu
Railway stations opened in 1930
Korea Train Express stations